Sound of Freedom or variants may refer to:

Film
 Sound of Freedom (film)

Music
 Soundz of Freedom, album Bob Sinclar 
 "Sound of Freedom" (song), song Bob Sinclar
 "Sounds of Freedom", song by Within Temptation from The Heart of Everything

Other
 Sounds of Freedom, US army runners in Great Aloha Run 
 Freedom of Sound, album by Bret Michaels, lead singer of the rock band Poison